The Marcy Group is a subset of the Great Range of the Adirondack Mountains, near Keene Valley, New York, United States.  It consists of the High Peaks near Mount Marcy at the southern end of the Great Range, Allen Mountain, Cliff Mountain, Mount Colden, Gray Peak, Mount Haystack, Mount Redfield, and Mount Skylight, and the lesser peaks McDonnel Mountain, North River Mountains Peak, and Rist Mountain.

References

External links
PeakBagger.com - Marcy Group

Adirondack High Peaks
Landforms of Essex County, New York
Mountain ranges of New York (state)